"Do It Right" is a song by English singer Anne-Marie. The song was released on 20 November 2015. The song peaked at number 22 in Australia and was certified gold.

The music video was filmed in Melbourne, Australia, in late 2015.

Track listing
Digital download
"Do it Right" – 3:15

Digital download (remixes)
"Do it Right"(Blinkie Remix)	- 3:28
"Do it Right" (M.A.X Remix)	- 5:28
"Do it Right"(Special Request Remix) (Club Mix) - 5:15

Charts

Certifications

Release history

References

2015 singles
2015 songs
Anne-Marie (singer) songs
Songs written by Anne-Marie (singer)